Euglossa decorata is a species of euglossine bee.

Taxonomy
This species is placed in the genus Euglossa, subgenus Euglossella. It is a member of the decorate species group which consists of bees with a brown to orange colored body with an iridescent or metallic sheen.

References

decorata
Insects described in 1874
Orchid pollinators